Porciúncula (Small Portion) is a municipality located in the northernmost point of the Brazilian state of Rio de Janeiro. Its population was 18,960 (2020) and its area is 302.201 km2.

References

Municipalities in Rio de Janeiro (state)
Populated places established in 1947
1947 establishments in Brazil